The New Adventures of Robin Hood is an action adventure television series that premiered on January 13, 1997, on TNT. The show was based on the legend of Robin Hood, the English folk hero, and was filmed in Vilnius, Lithuania. It was produced and distributed by Dune Productions, M6, and Warner Bros. International.

The tone of the series resembled its contemporaries Hercules: The Legendary Journeys and Xena: Warrior Princess. The premiere episode aired immediately after an episode of WCW Monday Nitro. A unique promotional effort took place between the two, with the Nitro main event—Hulk Hogan vs The Giant—not beginning until two minutes before the show ended, then continuing and being broadcast during portions of commercial breaks.

The New Adventures of Robin Hood aired for a total of four seasons with fifty-two episodes airing over a span of two calendar years. The first two seasons aired on TNT, and the series moved to first-run syndication for the final two.

Plot
Following the adventures of the legendary outlaw hero and his team, this series tells all new tales pitting Robin, Little John, Marion, and Tuck against the forces of oppression and greed. Similar to other fantasy-action shows at the time, such as Hercules: The Legendary Journeys and The Adventures of Sinbad, this version incorporates fantasy elements into the Robin Hood mythos, the most notable addition being the wizard Olwyn, who acts as a mentor to Robin. Among the recurring elements are enchanted weapons ("Robin and the Golden Arrow", "Devil's Bride"), monsters ("Nightmare of the Magic Castle", "Return of the Giant"), and time travel ("Return to Camelot", "The Time Machine").

Cast
 Robin Hood – Matthew Porretta (seasons 1–2);  John Bradley (seasons 3–4)
 Lady Marion Fitzwalter – Anna Galvin (season 1); Barbara Griffin (seasons 2–4)
 Little John – Richard Ashton
 Big John – Warwick Davis
 Friar Tuck – Martyn Ellis
 Olwyn – Christopher Lee
 Kemal – Hakim Alston
 Prince John – Andrew Bicknell
 Rowena – Christie Lee Woods
 Marjorie – Hélène Cardona

Episodes

Season 1 (1997, TNT)

Season 2 (1997, TNT)

Season Three (1998, syndication)
27. First Love: Robin's former fiancé seeks the outlaw hero's help in rescuing her husband.

28. The Haunted Castle: An investigation into a man and his daughter's disappearance leads to the team confronting their own fears.

29. The Giant King: When the son of old friend falls ill, Robin and the team seek out the last of a race of Irish giants with healing breath. But when the young man is cured, he becomes a tyrant.

30. Sword of the Samurai: Robin teams up with an aspiring samurai to retrieve a sword from the evil Count Frederick.

31. Robinville: A visit to a celebration in Robin's honor turns chaotic when the son of the man Robin freed the town from seeks revenge.

32. Vanishing Act: When Marion, and later Little John's sister Ingrid, go missing, Robin and Little John  get help from a hermit to find them.

33. The Hunter: In a Predator-style episode, Rowena accidentally summons a creature who must collect seven warriors for a sacrifice that will enhance his power.

34. A Date with Destiny: Robin is sent back fifteen years and mistakenly alters history.

35. Orphans: Robin must rescue a young boy from an evil knight who seeks to overthrow his cousin, a queen.

36. The Assassin: Robin and the team must keep three nobles safe from a shapeshifting assassin.

37. Body and Soul: Robin dies in action before his time and must occupy another body while a new one is being created.

38. Assault on Castle Dundeen: The team helps a young lord protect his castle from his evil uncle.

39. The Auction: An auction held by Tuck is put on hold when Robin learns his father may still be alive. Or is he?

Season Four (1999, syndication)
40. Ringside Murder: Tuck is framed for the murder of a lord and the team must clear his name.

41. Heroes: The Sheriff has a look-a-like pose as Robin while the real one is sent back in time, and placed in the body of a treacherous ancestor.

42. Godiva: An evil sorceress seeks revenge on Robin.

43. Raven's Peak: The team must help a man hide when he's accused of murder.

44. Black Rose: An exiled Amazon named Black Rose plans to assassinate Queen Eleanor.

45. The Running Bride: Robin must escort a princess  to her wedding while keeping her safe from an evil duke and earl.

46. The Prison: Marion is taken hostage by prisoners who plan to unleash a plague on England.

47. The Rebellion: Olivia (from "First Love") is taken by the evil Lord Tumble after her husband is killed.

48. Return to Camelot: Merlin transports Robin to the past to train a young King Arthur.

49. The Hanged Man: In a plot similar to The Manchurian Candidate, The Sheriff uses a mad scientist to brainwash either Marion, Little John, or Tuck to kill Robin.

50. The Time Machine: A teenager named Elvis travels back to Nottingham via his father's time machine, only to have it stolen by raiders

51. Day After Day: Robin must free his team and a whole village when an evil warlock curses the area to relive the same day over and over until the woman he obsesses over agrees to marry him.

52. Return of the Giant: A lord uses a spell to summon a giant to kidnap the woman who rejected his proposal.

Home media

Notes

References

External links
 

1990s French television series
1997 American television series debuts
1998 American television series endings
1997 French television series debuts
1998 French television series endings
American fantasy television series
First-run syndicated television programs in the United States
Robin Hood television series
TNT (American TV network) original programming
English-language television shows
Cultural depictions of Eleanor of Aquitaine
French fantasy television series